Taypi K'uchu (Aymara taypi center, middle, k'uchu, q'uch'u corner, "central corner", also spelled Taypi Khuchu) is a  mountain in the Cordillera Real in the Andes of Bolivia. It is situated in the La Paz Department, Los Andes Province, Batallas Municipality. Taypi K'uchu lies south-west of the mountains Jach'a Juqhu and Ch'iyar T'ikhi and north-west of Qullqi Chata.

References 

Mountains of La Paz Department (Bolivia)